The Raimondi Chapel is a chapel within the church of San Pietro in Montorio, Rome, Italy. The chapel houses the tombs of two members of the Raimondi family, Francesco and Raimondo. Both the architectural and sculptural elements of the chapel were designed by the artist Gianlorenzo Bernini - it was one of Bernini's first works where the relationship between the sculpture and the architecture was considered as a whole. Elements of the sculptures were executed by other artists in Bernini's circle; Andrea Bolgi did the busts of the two Raimondi brothers and the accompanying putti. Niccolò Sale undertook the reliefs on the tombs, while Francesco Baratta did the larger relief in the central altar. Work on the chapel took place between 1638 and 1648.

See also 
List of works by Gian Lorenzo Bernini

Notes

References

Further reading

External links
 

1630s sculptures
1640s sculptures
Marble sculptures in Italy
Sculptures by Gian Lorenzo Bernini